The Make-Up Artists and Hair Stylists Guild Award for Best Contemporary Hair Styling in a Motion Picture Made for Television or Special is one of the awards given annually to people working in the television industry by the Make-Up Artists and Hair Stylists Guild (MUAHS). It is presented to hair stylists who work in television, whose work has been deemed "best" in a given year. The award was first given in 2019. Before being singled out, television films and specials were nominated alongside miniseries in the category Best Contemporary Hair Styling in a Television Mini-Series or Motion Picture Made for Television.

Winners and nominees

2000s
Best Contemporary Hair Styling – Television (for a Mini-Series/Motion Picture Made for Television)

Best Hair Styling – Television Mini-Series/Movie of the Week

2010s
Best Contemporary Hair Styling in a Television Mini-Series or Motion Picture Made for Television

Best Contemporary Hair Styling in a Motion Picture Made for Television or Special

2020s
Best Contemporary Hair Stying- Television Special, One-Hour or More Live Program Series or Movie for Television

References

Contemporary Hair Styling in a Television Special, One-Hour or More Live Program Series or Movie for Television
Awards established in 2019